Herbert "Boxer" Milne (8 February 1884 – 20 December 1930) was an Australian rules footballer who played for the Fitzroy Football Club and South Melbourne Football Club in the Victorian Football League (VFL) during the early 1900s.

Family
The son of John Milne (1855-1921), and Mary Lavinia Milne, née Landorf, Herbert Milne was born at Benalla, Victoria on 8 February 1884.

One of his two brothers, Hector Norman Milne (1880-1960), who played two seasons (1899-1900) with Richmond and two seasons with North Melbourne (1902-1903) in the VFA, enlisted in the First AIF (Service no.953) and lost an eye from a bayonet wound whilst serving.

Football

Fitzroy
A follower, Milne had a distinguished career at Fitzroy where he won best and fairest awards in both 1908 and 1910. As part of a strong Fitzroy side he played in four successive Grand Finals, winning back to back flags in 1904 and 1905. He was also a Victorian interstate representative and appeared in the Australasian Championship, which took place at Melbourne in 1908.

South Melbourne
Milne crossed to South Melbourne in 1911.
"After an internal political dispute in the summer of [late] 1910, Milne was one of ten Fitzroy players to leave for other clubs." — Donald (2005), p.59.

In 1912, he played in their Grand Final loss to Essendon. He suffered a knee injury in this game and retired as a result.

Military service
Milne enlisted in the First AIF in July 1915, and served overseas with the 14th Field Ambulance. In late 1917 suffered serious wounds when hit by machine gun bullets in his left thigh.

Death
An employee of the Vacuum Oil Company, he died at sea near Colombo, Sri Lanka when returning to Australia on the P & O's S.S. Moldavia, from a business trip to England. He was buried at sea, near Columbo.

See also
 1908 Melbourne Carnival

Footnotes

References
 League Football: The South Melbourne Team, The Weekly Times, (Saturday, 13 June 1908), p.25.
 J.W., "Obituaries", The Australasian, (Saturday, 17 January 1931), p.41.
 First World War Nominal Roll: Private Herbert Milne (7886), collection of the Australian War Memorial.
 First World War Embarkation Roll: Private Herbert Milne (7886), collection of the Australian War Memorial.
 First World War Service Record: Private Herbert Milne (7886), National Archives of Australia.

External links 

 
 

1884 births
1930 deaths
Australian rules footballers from Victoria (Australia)
Australian Rules footballers: place kick exponents
Fitzroy Football Club players
Fitzroy Football Club Premiership players
Mitchell Medal winners
Sydney Swans players
Two-time VFL/AFL Premiership players
Australian military personnel of World War I
People who died at sea